The Havana Public Library is a Carnegie library located at 201 W. Adams St. in Havana, Illinois. The library was built in 1902 to house Havana's library program, which began in 1896 and was previously kept in a room of the city hall. The building's construction was funded by an $8,000 grant from the Carnegie Foundation as well as a local library tax. The blond brick building was designed in the Classical Revival style. The front of the building features four bays separated by five Ionic pilasters, an asymmetrical pedimented entrance, and a stepped parapet atop the entrance bay.

The library was added to the National Register of Historic Places on February 16, 1994.

Notes

Library buildings completed in 1902
Buildings and structures in Mason County, Illinois
Carnegie libraries in Illinois
National Register of Historic Places in Mason County, Illinois
Education in Mason County, Illinois
Public libraries in Illinois
Libraries on the National Register of Historic Places in Illinois